Alpha Sigma Lambda is the oldest and largest national honor society for Non-traditional students (typically adults also engaged in professional careers) who achieve and maintain outstanding scholastic standards and leadership characteristics while adroitly handling  additional responsibilities of work and family.

The motto of Alpha Sigma Lambda is "First in Scholarship and Leadership". The founding chapter was established by Dr. Rollin Posey at Northwestern University in 1946, to recognize the accomplishments of those returning to  academic pursuits after the close of World War II.  Its purpose, he wrote, "is to bind together in one Society the excellent students within the University College in order to provide a stimulus for and recognition of their worthy efforts."

Today there are more than 300 active ASL chapters in the United States, including the Phi Beta chapter of Alpha Sigma Lambda at Harvard University and Gamma Tau chapter at Georgetown University.

References

External links
 Alpha Sigma Lambda official website
  at Association of College Honor Societies

Association of College Honor Societies
Honor societies
Student organizations established in 1946
1946 establishments in Illinois